Colin Edgar Kimmorley (born 24 August 1956) is a former Australian rules footballer who played with Collingwood in the Victorian Football League (VFL).

Notes

External links 

1956 births
Australian rules footballers from Queensland
Collingwood Football Club players
Western Magpies Australian Football Club players
Living people